Danique Stein (born 16 July 1990) is a former Swiss football defender, who last played for Basel in the Nationalliga A. She has also played for Concordia Basel (Nat. A), SC Freiburg and SC 07 Bad Neuenahr (Bundesliga).

She has been a member of the Swiss national team. As an Under-19 international she took part in the 2009 U-19 European Championship.

Since her retirement from active football she works for the foundation of the Youth Campus Basel and is in the business management, she is head of finances and responsible for the sectors administration and events.

References

1990 births
Living people
Swiss women's footballers
Expatriate women's footballers in Germany
Switzerland women's international footballers
Women's association football defenders
Women's association football midfielders
SC 07 Bad Neuenahr players
SC Freiburg (women) players
Swiss expatriate sportspeople in Germany
Swiss expatriate women's footballers
FC Basel Frauen players
Swiss Women's Super League players
Footballers from Basel